Paul Oscar Johnson (September 2, 1896 – February 14, 1973) was an American Major League Baseball outfielder.

References

Major League Baseball outfielders
Philadelphia Athletics players
Baseball players from Connecticut
1896 births
1973 deaths